Cohors prima Ulpia Galatarum ("1st Ulpian cohort of Galatians") was a Roman auxiliary cohort of infantry.

Name 
 Ulpia: Ulpian. The Imperial family name shows a link to the emperor Trajan (Marcus Ulpius Traianus).
 Galatarum: Galatians. At the time the unit was raised, the recruits came from the Roman province of Galatia.

Since there is no indication for milliaria and equitata, the unit was a Cohors quingenaria peditata with a nominal strength of 480 infantry (6 centuriae with 80 men each).

History 
The unit was probably raised by Trajan in preparation for his Parthian campaign around 112/113. It is attested on military diplomas for the province of Syria Palaestina issued in 136/137, 139, 142, 149/160, 158, 160 and 186. In 238 it was at Aquileia in Italy, presumably as part of the exercitus Aquilensis.

Garrisons 
Possible garrisons were:

 Aquileia:

Attested personnel 
The following personnel is attested on inscriptions:

Commanders
All commanders were prefects.

 Flavius Adiutor
 M. Ulpius Tryphon Megas Antoninianus
 T. Statilius Frontonianus

See also 
 Roman auxiliaries
 List of Roman auxiliary regiments

References
 Julian Bennett: THE REGULAR ROMAN AUXILIARY REGIMENTS FORMED FROM THE PROVINCES OF ASIA MINOR, ANATOLICA XXXVII, 2011, Pages 251-274, (PDF).
 John Spaul: Cohors² The evidence for and a short history of the auxiliary infantry units of the Imperial Roman Army, British Archaeological Reports 2000, BAR International Series (Book 841),

Citations

Military of ancient Rome
Auxiliary infantry units of ancient Rome